The Boston mayoral election of 1862 saw the return of Frederic W. Lincoln Jr. to the mayoralty for a fourth non-consecutive term.

Results

See also
List of mayors of Boston, Massachusetts

References

Mayoral elections in Boston
Boston
Boston mayoral
19th century in Boston